Salvador Costa Fontclara (born 17 March 1931) is a Spanish rower. He competed at the 1952 Summer Olympics in Helsinki with the men's coxed four where they were eliminated in the round one repêchage.

References

External links
 

1931 births

Possibly living people 
Spanish male rowers
Olympic rowers of Spain
Rowers at the 1952 Summer Olympics
People from Alt Empordà
Sportspeople from the Province of Girona
European Rowing Championships medalists